Dolly Parton has contributed to over 100 albums throughout her career. These contributions range from solo recordings and duets to providing backing and harmony vocals for other artists. This additional work spans Parton's entire career, beginning in 1966 when she provided uncredited harmony vocals on Bill Phillips' recording of her composition "Put It Off Until Tomorrow" through her most recent collaboration with Appalachian Road Show in 2022 on "In Time, Jubilation".

Other album appearances

Notes

References

Dolly Parton